WTKW ("TK99") is a classic rock radio station in Bridgeport, New York. The station broadcasts to the Syracuse, New York market on a frequency of 99.5 FM.

The station also simulcasts on full-power satellite WTKV (105.5 FM) in Minetto, New York (serving Oswego) and low-power translator W256AC (99.1 FM) for Downtown Syracuse.

In April 2007, WTKW/WTKV became the flagship station of Syracuse University athletics with play-by-play coverage of Men's Football, Men's Basketball and Men's Lacrosse games.

External links
WTKW Official Website

Classic rock radio stations in the United States
TKW